This is a list of seasons played by Athletic Bilbao in Spanish and European football, from 1898 to the most recent completed season. It details the club's achievements in major competitions, and the top scorers for each season.

The club has won the League eight times, the Spanish Cup 24 times (including one disputed victory competing as Vizcaya), the Spanish Super Cup three times (once by default after completing a double), and the Copa Eva Duarte once.

Key

Key to league record:
 Pos = Final position
 Pld = Matches played
 W = Matches won
 D = Matches drawn
 L = Matches lost
 GF = Goals for
 GA = Goals against
 Pts = Points

Key to rounds:
 W = Winner
 F = Final
 SF = Semi-finals
 QF = Quarter-finals
 R16 = Round of 16
 R32 = Round of 32
 R64 = Round of 64

 R5 = Fifth round
 R4 = Fourth round
 R3 = Third round
 R2 = Second round
 R1 = First round
 GS = Group stage

Seasons

References

External links
 Athletic Club at La Liga 
 Club profile at BDfutbol (match summaries in each season, dating from 1928–29) 
From official website: 
 Current season matches
 Current season league statistics
 Current season cup statistics
 Current season continental statistics
 Past seasons (sortable by competition and year)

Seasons
 
Athletic Bilbao
Seasons